Senator Beall may refer to:

Members of the United States Senate
J. Glenn Beall Jr. (1927–2006), U.S. Senator from Maryland from 1971 to 1977
James Glenn Beall (1894–1971), U.S. Senator from Maryland from 1953 to 1965

United States state senate members
Daryl Beall (born 1946), Iowa State Senate
Edmond Beall (1848–1920), Illinois State Senate
Jim Beall (California politician) (born 1951), California State Senate
Philip D. Beall Jr. (1915–1988), Florida State Senate

See also
Richard L. T. Beale (1819–1893), Virginia State Senate
Senator Ball (disambiguation)
Senator Bell (disambiguation)